Learstar  may refer to:

 LearStar 600 or Bombardier Challenger 600, a family of business jets
 PacAero Learstar or Lockheed Model 18 Lodestar, a passenger transport aircraft of the World War II era